Khenpo Sodargye (Tibetan：མཁན་པོ བསོད་དར་རྒྱས；Chinese:索达吉堪布) is one of the most eminent contemporary Buddhist masters, and was born in the eastern region of Tibet known as Kham in 1962. Khenpo is a Tibetan lama, a Buddhist scholar and teacher, a prolific translator into Chinese, and a modern Buddhist thinker renowned across Asia and the west for his interest in the integration of traditional Buddhist teachings with worldwide issues and modern life.

Career 
In 1985 Khenpo was ordained at Larung Buddhist Institute, the largest Buddhist academy of its kind in the world, which is in present-day Sichuan province of the PRC. He trained closely with Khenchen Jigme Phuntsok Rinpoche, one of the great luminaries of his generation.

Khenpo Sodargye studied the traditional course of philosophical treatises and also received the entire corpus of Tibetan Buddhist transmissions.(These teachings include the five principle treatises on Madhyamaka, Prajnaparamita, Abhidharma, Vinaya, and Buddhist Logic, as well as the Great Perfection, Kalachakra, and Mipham Rinpoche's Guhyagarbha Tantra and Longchenpa's Seven Treasuries and Trilogy of Finding Comfort and Ease.) He was eventually placed in charge of the Institute where he became one of the principal teachers. He also served as Jigme Phuntsok Rinpoche’s main translator for Chinese disciples and was assigned by Rinpoche to teach them.

He has lectured extensively across China and other parts of Asia, Oceania, Europe as well as Africa and North America. He has recently given lectures at a number of Universities including Peking University, Tsinghua, Harvard, Columbia, Yale
, Princeton, Stanford, Oxford, Cambridge, University of Toronto, McGill University, University of Auckland, Melbourne University, University of Tokyo, Waseda University, National University of Singapore, National Taiwan University, University of Hong Kong and University of Göttingen.

Khenpo often says, “I don’t know how long I can live, but even if there were only one listener, I would exert myself to benefit him with Dharma till my last breath.”

Dharma propagation

In 1987, Khenpo accompanied Kyabje Khenchen Jigme Phuntsok Rinpoche to make a pilgrimage to the holy Wutai Mountain and began to receive Chinese disciples of the four types (monks, nuns, male and female lay practitioners).

From 1990 to 1999, Khenpo accompanied Kyabje Rinpoche to give Dharma teachings in many countries worldwide, including the United States, Canada, France, Germany, the Netherlands, United Kingdom, Bhutan, India, Nepal, Singapore, Malaysia, Thailand and Japan.

In 2006, Khenpo began to use modern media, such as Internet and DVD, to spread his teachings; allowing more followers to receive systematic Dharma training and benefiting a wider base of fortunate beings.

In April 2013, Khenpo was invited to give lectures in prestigious universities in the United States and Europe.

In November 2013, Khenpo was invited to give lectures in prestigious universities in southeast Asia.

In November 2014, Khenpo was invited to give lectures in Dharma centers and prestigious universities in New Zealand, Australia, Canada and the United States.

Starting from late 2015, he has instructed his students to offer open online courses on Buddhism in English.

Charitable activities

In 2007, Khenpo inaugurated his charitable project-Initiation of Loving Heart and encouraged Buddhist practitioners to cultivate loving-kindness and compassion in daily life and stop ignoring the needy. As an example, he started Wisdom and Compassion Elementary Schools, the Novice Monk Schools, nursing homes and accommodation to support the practice of the senior lay practitioners. From Feb 2011, Khenpo has served as the Honorary Chairman of Shanghai Kindness & Wisdom Public Foundation.

Publication introduction

Khenpo tirelessly teaches and translates the Dharma day and night. Presently, more than 100 Dharma books have been published through Khenpo's unfaltering efforts. All his translations (from Tibetan to Chinese) are collected in the “Treasure of Sutra and Tantra”, his compositions are collected in the “Treasure of Supreme Dharma”, and his oral teachings in the “Treasure of Wisdom and Compassion.”

Academic activities

Due to his productive works, Khenpo has become acknowledged in the academic field and has been invited to give talks in over 100 universities around the world since 2010. Both faculty and students found great benefit from Khenpo's visits.

World University Lecture Tours from 2010 to present: 

From September to October 2018, Khenpo was invited to give talks in Eswatini, South Africa in Africa
How to Realize the Meaning of Life in University of Eswatini, Eswatini
Embrace Life with Love in Shiselweni Orphanage, Eswatini
How to Learn and Grow through Hardship in Shiselweni Orphanage, Eswatini
Awakening at the Present Moment in St. Augustine College of South Africa, Johannesburg, South Africa
A Sunshine State of Mind Dispels Depression in Zomba Central Prison, Malawi
Happiness and Go Beyond in Domasi College of Education, Malawi
Let Hardship Help Us Grow  in Blantyre Orphanage, Malawi
Daily Practices and Rituals on Tibetan Buddhism in University of Cape Town, South Africa 
The Buddhist Perspective in the Era of Materialism in University of Botswana, Botswana

From October to December 2017, Khenpo was invited to give talks in the US, Europe and Israel. 
How to Practice Taking Refuge in Chicago, USA
The Life and Work of Khenpo Jigme Phuntsok Rinpoche: A Tibetan Buddhist Master in Modern China by University of Chicago in Chicago, USA
Modernity of Tibetan Buddhism by Northwestern University in Evanston, USA
The Art and Education of Tibetan Buddhism panel discussion at Northwestern University in Evanston, USA
A Way to Think in Turbulent Times by University of Chicago in Chicago, USA
Tibetan Language and Benefit of Buddhism in Boston, USA
The Practice of the Essence of Buddhism in Boston, USA
The Unshakable Faith in Boston, USA
Look Inside, Walk Outside-How to Develop Inner Peace While Living in the Modern World by Harvard University in Boston, USA
The Reincarnation System by the Massachusetts Institute of Technology, USA
The Impact of Buddhist Education on Modern Society in Manhattan, USA
Always Remembering Guruin New York, USA
Examining the Nature of Mind in New York, USA
Women's Role in Tibetan Buddhist Community by Columbia University in New York, USA
Understanding Impermanence by Columbia University in New York, USA
The Importance of Taking a Systematic Approach for Listening, Reflecting and Meditating in New York, USA
What Makes You so Busy? in New York, USA
Buddhist View of Freedom in Sweden
The Popularity of Tibetan Buddhism in Present-day China and in the West by Stockholm University in Stockholm, Sweden
The Power of Bodhicitta in Stockholm, Sweden
A Rare Kind of Happiness: The Heart Sutra in Stockholm, Sweden
How Buddhism Would Inspire Psychological Research of Subjective Well-being by Lund University in Lund, Sweden
Religious Practice and Education in Tibetan Buddhism by University of Oslo in Oslo, Norway
Science and Spirituality in Modern Day of Life in Oslo, Norway
Mindfulness in the Media and Technological Age in Oslo, Norway
Maintaining Tibetan Culture and Spirituality in Zurich, Switzerland
The Four Noble Truth in Zurich, Switzerland
Buddhist View of Self-compassion by Complutense University of Madrid in Madrid, Spain
Meditation in Action: Dance with Life by Complutense University of Madrid in Madrid, Spain
Reincarnation and the Law of Causality by Hebrew University of Jerusalem, Israel
The Relation between Scholarship and Experience by Hebrew University of Jerusalem, Israel
From September to November 2015, Khenpo was invited to give talks in Europe, Africa and Japan
Unexpected Meeting (Gli incontri fortuiti) by Torino Spiritualità in Torin, Italy

 Beautiful Living at Accademia Albertina in Torin, Italy
 Wisdom and Compassion at Rotterdam World Trade Center, Holland
 Buddhism and Moral Conduct at Leiden University, Holland
 How Tibetan Buddhism Appeals to the Yound and Urban? at Leiden University, Holland

 Fundamentals of Tibetan Buddhism and Modern Life in Grenoble, France
 Buddhist Philosophy and Happiness at UIAD in Grenoble, France
 Religious Harmony and World Peace in Grenoble, France
 Women’s Position in Tibetan Buddhism at Collège de France in Paris, France
 Eastern Wisdom and Western Life in Paris, France
 Tibetan Vajrayana at University of Vienna, Austria

 What is the Greatest Wealth? in Vienna, Austria
 Meditation, Modern Life and Mental Health at Oxford University, UK
 Reflections on a Life of Teaching and Translating Tibetan Buddhism across Cultures at Oxford University, UK
 Buddha‘s Path in Practice: An End in Itself or A Means of A Better World?  at Cambridge University, UK

 How Buddhism Views Happiness at London School of Economics, UK

 Buddhist View on Evolutionism and Creationism at London University College, UK
 Refuge in Buddhism and its Merit in Cape Town, South Africa
 Faith, Science and technology at Limkokwing University of Creative Technology, Lesotho
 Living with Love at National University of Lesotho, Lesotho
 Mindfulness and Meditation in the Modern World by the International University of Management, Namibia
 Philosophy of Tibetan Buddhism at the University of Tokyo, Japan
 Happy Living: Buddhadharma Can Change Your Life at Waseda University, Japan
 The Roses That Cherish Life in Tokyo, Japan
 How Could Buddhism Contribute to Japan in Tokyo, Japan

In November 2014, Khenpo was invited to give lectures in prestigious universities in New Zealand, Australia, Canada and the United States.

 The Popularity of Tibetan Buddhism in China at Stanford University
 The Relationship of Chan and Dzogchen at University of California, Berkeley
 Contemporary Tibetan Buddhist Meditation in China at University of Virginia
 Buddhist Meditation on Emptiness at Temple University

 Bodhisattva’s Path- the Practice and Action in the Modern Society at Princeton University
 Life of the Buddha at Yale University
 Mindfulness and Meditation in the Modern World at Yale University
 Pureland in Samsara-Larung at University of California, Los Angeles

 Living through Suffering at University of Southern California
 Women in Contemporary Tibetan Buddhism at McGill University
 The Mystery of Past Lives" at University of Toronto
 Cosmology in Tibetan Buddhism at University of Toronto
 Meditation-Finding Comfort and Easy in the Nature of Mind at York University
 Buddhist Phycology at University of Melbourne
 Compassion and Happiness in Tibetan Buddhism at University of Melbourne
 How Buddhism Sees the Material World at University of Sydney
 Meditation in Action at University of Technology, Sydney
 When God Meets the Buddha at University of Auckland
 What Faith Means in Buddhism at Massey University

In November 2013, Khenpo was invited to give lectures in prestigious universities in southeast Asia.

 Deciphering Reincarnation at Chulalongkorn University
 Faiths and Times at Mahidol University
 Realizing the Life at National University of Singapore
 The Mysterious Journey of Mind Training at National Taiwan University
 The Characteristics of Tibetan Buddhism at National Taiwan Normal University
 The Debate Methods in Buddhism at Huafan University
 Life Science and Value at National Taipei University

In April 2013, Khenpo was invited to give lectures in prestigious universities in the United States and Europe.

 Empathetic Visualization of Others as Self on the Bodhisattva Path at Harvard University:
 The Rimé (Non-Sectarian) Movement among Contemporary Tibetan Buddhists in China at Columbia University
 Why is Tibetan Buddhism Becoming Popular in China at Rubin Museum of Art, New York
 Tibetan Culture and Environment at University of Colorado, Boulder
 Visions and Prophecies in Tibetan Buddhism at the Center for Asian Studies at University of Colorado, Boulder:
 Tibetan Code of Happiness at George Washington University
 Tibetan Buddhism in 21st Century China and Beyond at Georgetown University
 Making Tibetan Buddhism Modern in China at Max Planck Institute for the Study of Religious and Ethnic Diversity
 Religion and Modernity at Center for East Asian Studies University of Göttingen

In June 2010, Khenpo was invited to give teachings in prestigious Chinese universities, such as Peking University and Tsinghua University; and in March 2011,to give seminar presentations in Fudan University, Nanjing University and Renmin University of China.In June 2011, Khenpo was invited to give presentations at Zhejiang University, Huazhong Normal University (AKA:Central China Normal University), Sun Yat-sen University, the Chinese University of Hong Kong and the Hong Kong Polytechnic University. From Nov 2011, Khenpo was invited to following universities in succession: Shanxi Normal University, Northwest University (China), Xi’an Transportation University, Shandong University, Hunan Normal University, Hong Kong Institute of Education, University of Hong Kong, Beijing Normal University, Central China University of Science and Technology and Qinghai Normal University.

 The Buddhist View on Emptiness at Peking University
 Religion & Life at Peking University
 The View of Mind Nurture and Regimen in Tibetan Culture at Tsinghua University
 The View of Material World in Buddhism at Fudan University
 The Buddhist View on Life Sciences at Nanjing University
 The Theory of Tibetan Buddhism & Real Life at Renmin University of China
 The Modern Significance of Mahayna Buddhism at Zhejiang University
 New Age Requires Spiritual Education at Central China Normal University
 Dispelling Confusion & Complementarity of Teaching and Learning at Central China Normal University
 Buddhist Theory and Methodology for Dispelling Afflictive Emotions at Sun Yat-sen University
 Pure Mind Leads to Pure Land at Chinese University of Hong Kong
 How to Face Suffering at Hong Kong Polytechnic University
 The Character and Philosophical Pith of Tibetan Tantrayana at Shanxi Normal University
 The Future Life & Being Reborn in the Pure Land at Northwest University (China)
 How Science to be the Ladder of Happiness at Xi’an Transportation University
 The Altruism in Tibetan Buddhism at Shandong University
 Buddhist View of Loving-Kindness and Moral Education at Hunan Normal University
 Life in Pursuit of Dreams & Initiating Spiritual Education at Hong Kong Institute of Education
 Buddhist Education in the Age of Advanced Science and Technology at Hong Kong University of Science and Technology
 The Quest of Treasure in Your mind at University of Hong Kong
 Buddhist Life Education at Beijing Normal University
 Buddhist View on Truths at Central China University of Science and Technology
 The Character and Values of Buddhist Culture at Qinghai Normal University

Other universities Khenpo was invited to give lectures include: Shantou University, Xiamen University, Xiamen University Tan Kah Kee College, Guangxi University and Lanzhou University of Finance and Economics.

Please try to find out what wisdom Khenpo shares on his official Facebook page: https://www.facebook.com/Sodargye

Publications

New Publication available at Amazon.cn

1. Living Through Suffering (Ch: 苦才是人生）) ISBN： 9787552700138

2. Achieving Through Doing (Ch: 做才是得到）) ISBN： 9787552700497

Recent Publications in English:

The Diamond Cutter Sutra:A Commentary by Dzogchen Master Khenpo Sodargye 

What Makes You So Busy?: Finding Peace in the Modern World

Always Remembering: Heartfelt Advice for Your Entire Life 

Tales for Transforming Adversity

Achieve by Doing,

Always Present 

Recent Publications in Chinese:

Living through Suffering

Achieve by Doing

Cruelty Is Youth

The Cutter-A Commentary on the Diamond Sutra

Always Present

Everything You Wish

What Makes You So Busy?

Letting Go, Everything?

Leaving behind, the Whole World?

Series of the “Treasure of Wisdom and Compassion”(Teachings)
1. The Great Commentary on the Guide to the Bodhisattavas’ Way of Life (Bodhicayavatara) Vol.I

(English Translation of the full text is available at Wisdom & Compassion Buddhist Web-Dharma Books)

2. The Great Commentary on the Guide to the Bodhisattavas’ Way of Life (Bodhicayavatara) Vol.II

3. The Great Commentary on the Guide to the Bodhisattavas’ Way of Life (Bodhicayavatara) Vol.III

4. The Great Commentary on the Guide to the Bodhisattavas’ Way of Life (Bodhicayavatara) Vol.IV

5. The Great Commentary on the Guide to the Bodhisattavas’ Way of Life (Bodhicayavatara) Vol.V

6. The Great Commentary on the Guide to the Bodhisattavas’ Way of Life (Bodhicayavatara) Vol.VI

7. The Great Commentary on the Guide to the Bodhisattavas’ Way of Life (Bodhicayavatara) Vol.VII

8. The Great Commentary on the Guide to the Bodhisattavas’ Way of Life (Bodhicayavatara) Vol.VIII

9. The Great Commentary on the Guide to the Bodhisattavas’ Way of Life (Bodhicayavatara) Vol.IX

10. The Great Commentary on the Guide to the Bodhisattavas’ Way of Life(Bodhicayavatara) Vol.X

11. Commentary on the Treasure of Logic on Valid Cognition (Pramanayuktinidhi) Vol. I

12. Commentary on the Treasure of Logic on Valid Cognition (Pramanayuktinidhi) Vol. II

13. Commentary on the Treasure of Logic on Valid Cognition (Pramanayuktinidhi) Vol. III

14. Commentary on the Treasure of Logic on Valid Cognition (Pramanayuktinidhi) Vol. IV

15. The Quintessential Butter of Dharma (Ch: Zheng Fa Ti Hu)
Including：
a. Commentary on Mipham Rinpoche’s the Teachings on Mundane and Transmundane Codes
b. Commentary on Thogme Zangpo’s the 37 Practices of a Bodhisattva(Rgyal-sras lag-len so-bdun-ma)
c. Commentary on Thogme Zangpo’s the Song of Happiness
16. Commentary on The Garland of White Lotus Flowers: Mipham Rinpoche's Commentary on Nagarjuna's “A letter to a Friend (Suhrllekha) ”(Bshe-spring gi mchan-grel padma-dkar-po’I phreng-ba)

17. The Supreme Vase of Prajna (Ch:Bo Ruo Miao Ping)
Including：
a. Commentary on Mipham Rinpoche’s the Sword of Wisdom for Thoroughly Ascertaining Reality
b. Commentary on Mipham Rinpoche’s Summary of the Ornament of Clear Realization(Abhisamayalankara)
c. Commentary on Mipham Rinpoche’s Overview of the Ornament of Clear Realization(Abhisamayalankara)

18. The Nectar of Enlightenment (Ch: Pu Ti Gan Lin)

19. Interpretation of the Standards for being a Good Student and Child in a Buddhist Way (Ch: Di Zi Gui Ling Jie)

20–24. Pure Land Practice in Tibetan Buddhism (Ch: Zang Chuan Jin Tu Fa)
20. Commentary on the Aspiration Prayer to Be Born in the Land of Bliss by Chagme Rinpoche (Karma-chags-med) Vol. I
21. Commentary on the Aspiration Prayer to Be Born in the Land of Bliss by Chagme Rinpoche (Karma-chags-med) Vol. II
22. Commentary on the Aspiration Prayer to Be Born in the Land of Bliss by Chagme Rinpoche (Karma-chags-me) Vol. III
23. Commentary on the Aspiration Prayer to Be Born in the Land of Bliss by Chagme Rinpoche (Karma-chags-med) Vol. IV
24. Commentary on the Aspiration Prayer to Be Born in the Land of Bliss by Chagme Rinpoche (Karma-chags-med) Vol. V

25–27. A Short Commentary on the Verse Summary of the Prajnaparamita

1. A Short Commentary on the Verse Summary of the Prajnaparamita Vol. I
2. A Short Commentary on the Verse Summary of the Prajnaparamita Vol. II
3. A Short Commentary on the Verse Summary of the Prajnaparamita Vol. III

28–30. Explanation of Mipham Rinpoche’s Commentary on Shantarakshita's Ornament of the Middle Way(Madhyamakālaṅkārapañjikā)
1. Explanation of Mipham Rinpoche’s Commentary on Shantarakshita's Ornament of the Middle Way Vol. I
2. Explanation of Mipham Rinpoche’s Commentary on Shantarakshita's Ornament of the Middle Way Vol. II
3. Explanation of Mipham Rinpoche’s Commentary on Shantarakshita's Ornament of the Middle Way Vol. III

31–35. The Great Commentary on the Words of My Perfect Teacher

1. The Great Commentary on the Words of My Perfect Teacher (Kun bzan bla ma’I zal lun) by Patrul Rinpoche Vol.I
2. The Great Commentary on the Words of My Perfect Teacher (Kun bzan bla ma’I zal lun) by Patrul Rinpoche Vol.II
3. The Great Commentary on the Words of My Perfect Teacher (Kun bzan bla ma’I zal lun) by Patrul Rinpoche Vol.III
4. The Great Commentary on the Words of My Perfect Teacher (Kun bzan bla ma’I zal lun) by Patrul Rinpoche Vol.IV
5. The Great Commentary on the Words of My Perfect Teacher (Kun bzan bla ma’I zal lun) by Patrul Rinpoche Vol.V
36. Commentary on Infinite Life Sutra (Amitayuḥ Sutra)

Pamphlets Series

1. The Liberation at Living and Death (Ch:Sheng Si Jiu Du)

Including:
a. The Merit of Releasing Captured Creatures (Ch: Fang Sheng Gong De Wen)
b. The Prayers for Liberating the Dying( Ch: Lin Zhong Guan Huai Wen)

2. Questions and Answers at Ease (Ch: Xian Tan Wen Da Lu)

Series of the “Treasure of Sutra and Tantra” (Translation)
1. The Collection of Dharma Instruction (Ch: Jiao Yan Hui Ji)

Including:

a. In Praise of Precepts by Ogyen Tendzin Norbu
b. The 37 Practices of a Bodhisattva by Bodhisattva Thogme Zangpo
c. The Dharma Song of Triumph by Jigme Phuntsok Rinpoche
d. The Jewel Garland of Bodhisattva by Je Atisha
e. The Three Principles Aspects of the Path by Je Tsongkapa (Losang Drakpa)
f. The Eight Verses for Training the Mind by Langri Tangpa
g. Thirty Heartfelt Advices by Omniscient Longchenpa
h. Instruction to Oneself by Patrul Rinpoche
i. On the Dual Codes of Mundane and Transmundane by Mipham Rinpoche
j. On the Code for Monarchs by Mipham Rinpoche
k. Sakya Pandita's Treasury of Good Advice
l. In Praise of Dependent Origination by Je Tsongkhapa

2. The Words of My Perfect Teacher (Kun bzan bla ma’I zal lun) by Patrul Rinpoche

3. The Sutra of One Hundred Karma Stories

4. Pure Land Practice in Tibetan Buddhism

Including:

a. The Aspiration Prayer to Be Born in the Land of Bliss by Chagme Rinpoche

b. A Great Commentary on the Aspiration Prayer to Be Born in the Land of Bliss by Lhala Chodri Rinpoche
c. The Teachings on Pure Land by Mipham Rinpoche

5. The Ocean of Pith Instruction Treasure (Ch: Qiao Jue Bao Zang Hai)

Including: Kyabje Khenchen Jigme Phuntsok Rinpoche's commentaries on Mipham Rinpoche's

a. The Debate between the Sleeping and Awakening
b. The Path of Great Perfection
c. The Unsurpassed Yoga
d. The Drop of Immaculate Nature of Enlightenment
e. The View, Meditation, Action and Fruit in the Great Perfection
f. The Essence of the Three Vehicles

6. The Quintessence of Vajrayana

Including:

a. The Luminous Treasure of the Great Illusory Net Tantra by Mipham Rinpoche
b. Direct Pointing the Nature of Mind in the Great Perfection by Mipham Rinpoche
c. Commentary on Direct Pointing the Nature of Mind of the Great Perfection by Jigme Phuntsok Rinpoche

7. The Innermost Heart Drop of the Guru

8. The Practice in Vajrayana

Including:
a. The Short Life Story of the Omniscient Longchenpa by Chodrak Sampo
b. The Short Life Story of the Omniscient Mipham Rinpoche by Jigme Phuntsok Rinpoche
c. The Treasure of Pith Instruction by Longchen Rabjam
d. The Practice Guidance of Finding Comfort and Ease in the Nature of Mind by Longchen Rabjam

9. The Great Chariot: A Treatise on Finding Comfort and Ease in the Nature of Mind in the Great Perfection by Longchen Rabjam Vol. I

10. The Great Chariot: A Treatise on Finding Comfort and Ease in the Nature of Mind in the Great Perfection by Longchen Rabjam Vol. II

11. Mipham Rinpoche's Great Biography of Buddha Shakyamuni Vol. I

12. Mipham Rinpoche's Great Biography of Buddha Shakyamuni Vol. II

13. The Lamp Directing the Path (Ch: Yin Lu Ming Deng)
Including:
a. The Garland of Practice in Mountain Solitude by Drakar Rinpoche
b. On Previous and Present Life by Khenpo Tsultrim Lodrö

14. The Ocean of Good Explanation: the Guide to the Bodhisattva’s Way of Life by Thogme Zangpo Rinpoche

15. The Essential Summary of the Precepts in Three Vehicles

16. The Commentary on the Middle Way by Mipham Rinpoche

17. The Commentary on the Mahayana Abhidharma by Lhode Wangpo

18. The Collective Stories of the Sublime Beings
Including:
a. The Journey to the Pure Land of Padmasambhava by Terton Dorje Dechen Lingpa
b. The Secretary Biography of Khentse Yeshe Dorje
c. The Marvelous Life Stories of 63 Vajrayana Mahasiddhas

19. The Gateway for Liberation

Including:

a. Opening the Door to Mind Training on the Graded Path to Enlightenment by Gyalwa Lodro Gyaltsen Palzang
b. The Root Verses of Beacon of Certainty by Mipham Rinpoche
c. The Commentary of Beacon of Certainty by Khenpo Genhor

20. The Commentary on the Ornament of the Middle Way(Madhaymakalankara)

Including:
a. The Root Text of the Ornament of the Middle Way by Shantarakshita
b. The Commentary on the Ornament of the Middle Way- A Teaching to Delight My Master Manjughosha by Mipham Rinpoche

21. A Compendium of Valid Cognition(Pramana)

Including:
The Treasure of Logic on Valid Cognition by Sakya Pandita

22. The Commentary on the Ornament of Clear Realization by Mipham Rinpoche

23. Majushiri Peaceful Practice of the Great Perfection by Jigme Phuntsok Rinpoche

24. A Great Treatise on Nagarjuna's Jewel Garland of Middle Way by Lhala Chodri Rinpoche

25. The Bright Mirror for Adopting and Abandoning

26. A Guide to the Words of My Perfect Teacher by Khenpo Ngawang Pelzang

27. A Commentary on Summary Verses of Prajna by Mipham Rinpoche

28. A Treatise on the Ornament of Clear Realization by Patrul Rinpoche and Mipham Rinpoche

29. Autobiography of the First Kyabje Dudjom Rinpoche

30. Twenty Verses of Mahayana by Bodhisattva Nagarjuna

31. Heartfelt Advice on Worldly Codes by Tukwa Sangye Lobsang Chogye Nyma

32. Introduction to the Two Truths by Venerable Atisha

33. Twenty One Praises of Tara

34. The Weel of Sharp Weapon on Mind Training by Dharmarakshita

Series of the “Treasure of Supreme Dharma”(Compositions)

1. The Treasure of the Source of Faith

including:
a. The Biography of Khenpo Jigme Phuntsok Rinpoche
b. Buddhist View on Sciences
c. The Commentary on the Diamond Sutra

2. The Collection of Commentaries

including:
a. A Short Commentary on the Dharma Song of Triumph
b. A Short Commentary on the Eight Points of Mind Training
c. A Short Commentary on the Three Principles of the Path
d. A Short Commentary on the Verse Summary of the Stages of the Path
e. A Short Commentary on the Instruction to Oneself by Patrul Rinpoche

3. Children's Book on Buddhism

4. The Great Commentary on the Four Hundred Verses on the Middle Way

5. The Cloud Aggregation of Wisdom Rays

Including:
a. The Miserable World
b. The Merit of Releasing Captured Creatures
c. Dispelling the Confusion on Mantrayana
d. Short Stories of Rainbow-Body Accomplishers in Mantrayana
e. A Short Treatise on the Compatibility of the Different Traditions in Buddhism
f. The Wish-fulfilling Jewel Tree of the Merit of Observing Precepts
g. The Bright Lamp Leading to Mantrayana

6. The Great Commentary on the Bodhicaryavatara I

7. The Great Commentary on the Bodhicaryavatara II

8. The Great Commentary on the Bodhicaryavatara III

9. Commentary on the Treasure of AphorismI

10. Commentary on the Treasure of AphorismII

11. Commentary on the Instructions on the Proprieties of a Principal

12. The Sprays of the Wisdom Ocean I

13. The Sprays of the Wisdom Ocean II

14. The Lightful Torch Dispelling Confusion

Including:
a. The Questions and Answers on Mantrayana
b. Dispelling the Wrong Views

15. Awakening from Confused Dreams

Including:
a. The View on Vegetarian Diet in Tibetan Mantrayana
b. Mere Using as References or Investigation Is Not Enough
c. The Buddhist Rays in the World

16. Commentary on Longchenpa's Treasure of Pith Instructions

17. Questions and Answers on Abhidharma

18. The Wonderful Ladder of the Supreme Vehicle

Including:
The Short Commentary on the Seven Points of Mind Training
A Short Commentary on the Garland of the Four Dharmas

19. The Footprints in the Journey

20. The Great Commentary on Abhidarma-kosa I

21. The Great Commentary on Abhidarma-kosa II

22. The Clear Stream of Wisdom and Compassion

23. The Gateway of Mind Training I

24. The Gateway of Mind Training II

25. The Distillation of the Genuine Dharma

26. Commentary on Mipham's Beacon of Certainty I

27. Commentary on Mipham's Beacon of Certainty II

28. The Jewel Lamp of Wisdom

29. The Commentary on the Fundamental Wisdom of the Middle Way I

30. The Commentary on the Fundamental Wisdom of the Middle Way II

31. The Commentary on the Garland of Instructions for the Mountain Solitary

References

1962 births
Tibetan Buddhist monks
Buddhist writers
Living people